The 1990 WNBL season was the tenth season of competition since its establishment in 1981. A total of 13 teams contested the league.

Regular season

Ladder

Finals

Season Awards

Statistical leaders

References

 Final Standings
 Media Guide 2014-15
 Media Guide 2011-12

1990
1990 in Australian basketball
Aus
basketball